Hypercompe nigriloba is a moth of the family Erebidae first described by Gustaaf Hulstaert in 1924. It is found in Brazil.

References

Hypercompe
Moths described in 1924